The 1968 Dartmouth Indians football team was an American football team that represented Dartmouth College during the 1968 NCAA University Division football season. The Indians finished fifth in the Ivy League.

In their 14th season under head coach Bob Blackman, the Indians compiled a 4–5 record but outscored opponents 206 to 183. Randolph Wallick was the team captain.

The Indians' 3–4 conference record placed fifth in the Ivy League standings. The Indians outscored Ivy opponents 168 to 154. 

Dartmouth played its home games at Memorial Field on the college campus in Hanover, New Hampshire.

Schedule

References

Dartmouth
Dartmouth Big Green football seasons
Dartmouth Indians football